Setepenre is an often-used title of Egyptian kings (pharaohs), meaning "Elect of Re". It was also used as a personal name in at least two instances.

Pronunciation
In Akkadian records, the name (referring to Ramesses II) is rendered in cuneiform script as šá-te-ep-na-ri/e-a. According to the Egyptologist Antonio Loprieno, the word was likely pronounced .

As a personal name
 Setepenre, last daughter of Akhenaten and Nefertiti (18th Dynasty)
 Setepenre, a son of  Ramesses II (19th Dynasty)

As a throne name
 Usermaatre Setepenre (Ramesses II)
 Userkheperure Setepenre (Seti II)
 Akhenre Setepenre (Siptah)
 Usermaatre Setepenre (Ramesses VII)
 Neferkare Setepenre Khaemwaset (Ramesses IX)
 Khepermaatre Setepenre (Ramesses X)
 Hedjkheperre Setepenre (Smendes I)
 Aakheperre Setepenre (Osorkon the Elder)
 Netjerkheperre Setepenre (Siamun)
 Titkheperure Setepenre (Psusennes II)
 Hedjkheperre Setepenre (Shoshenq I)
 Sekhemkheperre Setepenre (Osorkon I)
 Heqakheperre Setepenre (Shoshenq II)
 Hedjkheperre Setepenre (Takelot I)
 Usermaatre Setepenre (Shoshenq III)
 Hedjkheperre Setepenre (Takelot II)
 Hedjkheperre Setepenre (Shoshenq IV)
 Usermaatre Setepenre (Pami)
 Uasnetjerre Setepenre (Shoshenq VII, existence doubtful)

References

Ancient Egyptian given names
Theophoric names